is a Japanese sprint canoer who has competed since the mid-2000s. Competing in two Summer Olympics, she earned her best finish of fifth in the K-2 500 m event at Beijing in 2008.

External links
Sports-Reference.com profile

1980 births
Canoeists at the 2004 Summer Olympics
Canoeists at the 2008 Summer Olympics
Japanese female canoeists
Living people
Olympic canoeists of Japan
Asian Games medalists in canoeing
Canoeists at the 2002 Asian Games
Canoeists at the 2006 Asian Games
Medalists at the 2002 Asian Games
Medalists at the 2006 Asian Games
Asian Games silver medalists for Japan
Asian Games bronze medalists for Japan